Neocollyris cruentata is a species of ground beetle in the genus Neocollyris in the family Carabidae. It was described by Schmidt-Goebel in 1846.

References

Cruentata, Neocollyris
Beetles described in 1846